Enathi is a village in Tamil Nadu, India, located in india
The village has many temples, such as Boongulam, Ancheneya, Kali, and some Vinayagar and Ayyanar. Kabaddi is a popular game in the village, and a number of well-known players are from here.

Enathi village is known for having many cultural activities. Veera Pandiya Kattabomman and Harichnadra dramas are periodically staged and acted by village locals during festivals. Village cultural activities include oyilattam for men, and kummy for both men and women.

The village contains one bank, the Primary Agriculture Cooperative Bank. The nearby village's Chitrangudi Bird Sanctuary is popular. 

The saintly devotees of Shiva are known as Nayanmar or Nayanar). There are 63 of them, one of them from this village is called "Enathi natha nayanar".

The climate of Karisal Kaadu is semi-arid, with hot and dry summers.

Geography 

The Vinayagar and Ayyanar Swamy Temple occupies the major area of Enathi.

Schools 

 Anjaneya Matriculation School
 Government primary school

Business 

The majority of the population works in agriculture; commercial activity in the area is also related to this.

Politics 

Enathi is part of Ramanathapuram (Lok Sabha Constituency) and the Mudukulathur Assembly Constitution.

References 

About Enathi natha nayanar
About Boongulathan Kabaddi Club
Rajaboopathy

Cities and towns in Ramanathapuram district